Giuseppe Bonito (11 January 1707 – 9 May 1789) was a Neapolitan painter of the Rococo period. Giuseppe Bonito is known for genre depictions on canvas. Many of Gaspare Traversi's paintings had previously been attributed to Bonito.

Biography  
Bonito was born at Castellammare di Stabia, and, like Traversi, was a student at the large studio of Francesco Solimena. One of his contemporaries there was Gaspare Traversi. Bonito represented urban scenes with folklore details and figures of commedia dell'arte. Between the 1736 and 1742 Bonito worked for the House of Borbon in the royal Palace of Portici. He also painted portraits including one of Maria Amalia of Saxony, wife of the Charles VII, king of Naples and Charles III of Spain. An altarpiece of the  Immaculate Conception was painted in 1789 for the chapel of Royal Palace of Caserta. One of his pupils was Angelo Mozzillo. He died in Naples.

Gallery

References
 Museum Network; legend for Bowes Museum piece.
 Biography.

1707 births
1789 deaths
People from Castellammare di Stabia
18th-century Italian painters
Italian male painters
Painters from Naples
Italian Baroque painters
Rococo painters
18th-century Italian male artists